James I may refer to:

People
James I of Aragon (1208–1276)
James I of Sicily or James II of Aragon (1267–1327)
James I, Count of La Marche (1319–1362), Count of Ponthieu
James I, Count of Urgell (1321–1347)
James I of Cyprus (1334–1398), also titular king of Armenia and Jerusalem
James I of Scotland (1394–1437)
James VI and I (1566–1625), King of Scotland and also King of England and Ireland
James Harden-Hickey or James I (1893–1895), self-declared Prince James I of Trinidad

Other uses
 James 1, the first chapter of the Epistle of James
 James I Land, Spitsbergen, Svalbard

See also

James (disambiguation)
James II (disambiguation)
James III (disambiguation)
James IV of Scotland
James V of Scotland